The Defense Counterintelligence and Security Agency (DCSA) is a federal security and defense agency of the United States Department of Defense (DoD) that reports to the Under Secretary of Defense for Intelligence. DCSA is the largest counterintelligence and security agency in the federal government and is responsible for providing Personnel Vetteing, Critical Technology Protection, Counterintelligence, Training, Education and Certification. DCSA services over 100 federal entities, oversees 10,000 cleared companies, and conducts approximately 2 million background investigations each year.

Background

The agency was originally established as the Defense Investigative Service and was created on January 1, 1972.  In 1999, the agency changed its name to the Defense Security Service.  In July 2019, DSS was reorganized as DCSA, in conjunction with the transfer of responsibility for conducting background investigations from OPM's National Background Investigations Bureau.

Responsibility

DCSA conducts personnel security investigations for 95% of the federal government, supervise industrial security, and perform security education and awareness training. DCSA also provides the uniformed US military services, Department of Defense Agencies, 35 federal agencies, and approximately 10,000 cleared government contractor facilities with security support services. The Director of DCSA reports to the Under Secretary of Defense for Intelligence.

National Industrial Security Program

DCSA administers the National Industrial Security Program on behalf of the Department of Defense and 35 other federal agencies. DCSA provides oversight to approximately 10,000 cleared contract companies to ensure they are adequately protecting facilities, personnel, and associated Information Technology systems from attacks and vulnerabilities.

Personnel

DCSA Industrial Security Representatives, Background Investigators and Information System Security Professionals are credentialed Special Agents. DCSA also uses a number of contract investigators  and staff to help support DCSA's various mission.

Locations

Defense Counterintelligence and Security Agency headquarters is located on Marine Corps Base, Quantico, Va. DCSA's field presence consists of 167 field offices across the United States.

See also
US military investigative organizations
 Air Force Office of Special Investigations (AFOSI)
 Coast Guard Investigative Service (CGIS)
 Defense Criminal Investigative Service (DCIS)
 Naval Criminal Investigative Service (NCIS)
 United States Army Counterintelligence (ACI)
 United States Army Criminal Investigation Command (USACIDC or CID)
 United States Marine Corps Criminal Investigation Division (USMCCID or CID)

References

External links

 

Security Service